Separate Lives is a 1995 American psychological thriller film directed by David Madden and starring James Belushi, Linda Hamilton, Vera Miles and Elisabeth Moss.

Plot 
Dr. Lauren Porter's friend was killed a few years ago. Tom Beckwith, an ex-cop who gave up the profession after his wife died, follows Lauren's classes in order to become a psychiatrist. He learns that Lauren has a personality disorder after she convinces him to follow her with a camera and film her.

On his first tailing, Tom is beaten by a nightclub's owner who also turns out to be the boyfriend of Lauren's alter ego, Lena. Tom quits, but Lauren persuades him to reconsider. They confide in each other about their respective families. Tom is having a hard time raising his tomboyish daughter Ronni alone while Lauren confides she was the only witness for her mother and stepfather's murders. Her real father Robert, meanwhile, has moved on and is now a happy husband and father again.

Tom tries to connect with his ex-colleagues in investigating the murders. He learns that Lauren has an ex-husband, Charles, with whom she stayed on good terms. However, Charles is soon killed.

Tom decides to invite Lauren home for a dinner, where she makes Ronni understand that despite any personal problems, Tom is still her father and cares about her.

Believing the solution can be found at Lauren's childhood house, Tom drives her there. They discover that Robert is the real culprit. He manipulated his daughter, the only witness, by saying that she was as responsible as he was. Tom is shot in the arm, and Lauren tries to get her father to not kill his own daughter, but Robert coldly refuses to let her go and prepares to kill Lauren, claiming he has always hated her and his family. Seeing Robert as the irredeemable monster he truly is, Tom gets back up and manages to disarm Robert, before throwing him out the window to his death.

Tom promises to keep in touch with Lauren, who is committed to an asylum. Before he departs, they kiss.

Cast 

 James Belushi as Tom Beckwith
 Linda Hamilton as Lauren Porter / Lena
 Vera Miles as Dr. Ruth Goldin
 Elisabeth Moss as Ronni Beckwith
 Drew Snyder as Robert Porter
 Mark Lindsay Chapman as Keno Sykes
 Marc Poppel as Detective Joe Gallo
 Elizabeth Arlen as Dee Harris
 Josh Taylor as Charles Duffy
 Ken Kerman as Detective Boyle
 Michael Whaley as Detective Miller
 Jackie Debatin as Darlene
 Joshua Malina as Randall
 Lisa Vanderpump as Heidi Porter
 Craig Stepp as David Mills
 Lisa Chess as Margaret Porter-Mills

External links 
 
 

1995 films
1995 thriller films
1990s psychological thriller films
American psychological thriller films
Films scored by William Olvis
Trimark Pictures films
1990s English-language films
1990s American films